Trituba is a genus of minute sea snails, marine gastropod molluscs in the family Newtoniellidae.

Species
Species in the genus Trituba include:
 Trituba additicia Gofas, 2003
 Trituba anelpistos (Bouchet & Fechter, 1981)
 Trituba barbadensis (Coomans & Faber, 1984)
 † Trituba bitubulata (Baudon, 1856)
 Trituba blacki (B.A. Marshall, 1977)
 Trituba constricta Gofas, 2003
 Trituba dexia (Verco, 1909)
 Trituba elatissima Gofas, 2003
 Trituba epallaxa (Verco, 1909)
 Trituba fallax Gofas, 2003
 Trituba hirta Gofas, 2003
 Trituba incredita Gofas, 2003
 Trituba lima Gofas, 2003
 † Trituba neozelanica (Laws, 1939)
 Trituba recurvata Gofas, 2003
 Trituba superstes (Bouchet & Fechter, 1981)
 † Trituba zecollata (Laws, 1941)
Subgenus
 Subgenus Trituba (Granulotriforis) Kosuge, 1967 represented as Trituba Jousseaume, 1884 (alternate representation)
 Trituba (Granulotriforis) antepallaxa (B. A. Marshall, 1977)
 Trituba (Granulotriforis) nonnitens (Barnard, 1963)
 Trituba (Granulotriforis) tanseiae (Kosuge, 1967)
 Trituba (Granulotriforis) tui (B. A. Marshall, 1977)

References

 Jousseaume 1884. Monographie des Triforidae. Bulletin de la Société Malacologique de France, 1(3): 217-270, pl. 4
  Verco, J.C. 1909. ''Notes on South Australian marine Mollusca with descriptions of new species. Part XII; Transactions of the Royal Society of South Australia v. 33 (1909)

Newtoniellidae